The discography of American country music artist Janie Fricke contains 24 studio albums, one live album, ten compilation albums, 44 singles, seven music videos, and 14 other appearances. Fricke was signed to Nashville's Columbia Records as a solo artist in 1977. Later that year, her debut single, "What're You Doing Tonight", reached the top-forty on the country songs chart. The following year her debut studio album, Singer of Songs, was issued. Between 1978 and 1980, Fricke issued three studio albums which resulted in two major hits: "Please Help Me, I'm Fallin" (1978) and "I'll Love Away Your Troubles for Awhile" (1979). 

With a change in musical direction, Fricke began recording ballads in 1980, strengthening the success of her singles. "Down to My Last Broken Heart" and "I'll Need Someone to Hold Me (When I Cry)" were her first pair of top-ten hits on the Billboard Hot Country Singles chart. An album of the same name was also released that year, which reached the top-thirty on the Top Country Albums chart. With her sixth studio album, Fricke reached the top spot of the Billboard country chart with its second single "Don't Worry 'bout Me Baby" (1982). This would start a series of number-one country singles during this period. It Ain't Easy (1982), her seventh studio record, reached number fifteen on the Top Country Albums list and spawned three number-one hits: "It Ain't Easy Bein' Easy", "He's a Heartache (Looking for a Place to Happen)", and "Tell Me a Lie".

With the inclusion of more up-tempo material, Fricke reached the number one spot two more times in 1983 and 1984 with "Let's Stop Talkin' About It" and "Your Heart's Not in It". Fricke also collaborated with Merle Haggard in 1984 on "A Place to Fall Apart", which reached number one on the country songs chart. In 1986, her eleventh studio album Black and White was issued and became her highest-charting record on the Top Country Albums list. Its lead single "Always Have, Always Will" reached the number one spot also and became her final top ten hit. Fricke released three more studio albums for Columbia Records until 1989, all of which did not produce any major hits. Labor of Love (1989) spawned her final-charting Billboard single called "Give 'em My Number", which peaked at number forty-three. While performing in Branson, Missouri during the 1990s, Fricke released two Gospel-inspired studio albums: Crossroads: Hymns of Faith (1992) and Now & Then (1993). With her own recording label, she released Bouncin' Back (2000), her nineteenth studio album. Via her own label she would issue two more studio albums in the 2000s decade She has since released a live album in 2002 and a studio album of Christmas material in 2020.

Albums

Studio albums

Live albums

Compilation albums

Singles

As lead artist

As a featured artist

Music videos

Other appearances

Notes

See also 
 List of artists who reached number one on the U.S. country chart
 List of number-one country hits (United States)
 List of years in country music

References

External links 
 Janie Fricke music at Discogs

Fricke, Janie
Discographies of American artists